El Tranco de Beas Dam, also known as Pantano del Tranco is a reservoir across the high Guadalquivir in the Sierra de Segura range, Andalusia, Spain.

See also 
 List of reservoirs and dams in Andalusia

References

External links 
 Agencia del agua Junta de Andalucía 
 Reservoirs status summary 
 Confederación Hidrográfica del Guadalquivir 
 Dam Construction

Guadalquivir
Reservoirs in Andalusia